The Brecon Beacons National Park is one of three national parks in Wales, and is centred on the Brecon Beacons range of hills in southern Wales. It includes the Black Mountain in the west, Fforest Fawr (translates as 'great forest') and the Brecon Beacons in the centre and the Black Mountains in the east.

Description

The Brecon Beacons National Park was established in 1957, the last of the three Welsh parks designated after Snowdonia in 1951 and the Pembrokeshire Coast in 1952. It stretches from Llandeilo in the west to Hay-on-Wye in the northeast and Pontypool in the southeast, covering  and encompassing four main regions – the Black Mountain in the west, reaching  at Fan Brycheiniog, Fforest Fawr and the Brecon Beacons in the centre, including the highest summit in the park and in South Wales at Pen y Fan  and the confusingly named Black Mountains in the east, where the highest point is Waun Fach . The western half gained European and global status in 2005 as Fforest Fawr Geopark. This includes the Black Mountain, the historic extent of Fforest Fawr, and much of the Brecon Beacons and surrounding lowlands.

The Black Mountains in the east are clearly separated from the central Beacons by the Usk valley between Brecon and Abergavenny. The other three regions form a continuous massif of high ground above 300 metres (1000'), and the divisions are less clear; the A470 road forms the approximate boundary between the central Beacons and Fforest Fawr, while a minor road from Sennybridge to Ystradgynlais divides Fforest Fawr from the Black Mountain range to the west.

The entire national park achieved the status of being an International Dark Sky Reserve in February 2013.

Most of the national park is bare, grassy moorland grazed by Welsh mountain ponies and Welsh mountain sheep, with scattered forestry plantations, and pasture in the valleys. It is known for its remote reservoirs, waterfalls including the  Henrhyd Waterfall and the falls at Ystradfellte, and its caves, such as Ogof Ffynnon Ddu. The Brecon Beacons Mountain Centre was opened in 1966 to help visitors understand and enjoy the area. Common ravens, peregrine falcons, northern wheatears, ring ouzels, and the rare merlin breeds in the park. The red kite can also be spotted.

Due to the relative remoteness and harsh weather of some of its uplands, the park is used for military training. UK Special Forces, including the SAS and SBS hold demanding selection training exercises here, such as an exercise called the Fan dance. The infantry regiments of the British Army train at Sennybridge, where NCO selection also takes place.

In 2006 and 2007, controversy surrounded the government decision to build the South Wales Gas Pipeline through the park, the National Park Authority calling the decision a "huge blow".

Local government
The Brecon Beacons National Park Authority is a special purpose local authority with wide-ranging responsibilities for the conservation and enhancement of the landscape and the promotion of its enjoyment by the public, and in particular exercises planning functions across the designated area of the park. The park extends across the southern part of Powys, the northwestern part of Monmouthshire and parts of eastern Carmarthenshire. It also includes the northernmost portions of several of the unitary authority areas which are centred on the coalfield communities to the south and including the county boroughs of Rhondda Cynon Taf, Merthyr Tydfil and Blaenau Gwent together with very small parts of Caerphilly and Torfaen.

Numerous town and community councils operate within these areas and include the town councils for Brecon and Hay on Wye and the community councils for Cefn-coed-y-cymmer, Llanfihangel Cwmdu with Bwlch and Cathedine, Llangattock, Llangors, Llanthony, Llywel, Pontsticill, Pontsarn and Vaynor, Talybont-on-Usk, Trallong, Trecastle and Ystradfellte.

Activities
Outdoor activities in the park include walking, cycling, mountain biking, horse riding, as well as sailing, windsurfing, canoeing and fishing, rock climbing, hang-gliding, caravanning, camping and caving. A long-distance cycling route, the Taff Trail, passes over the Beacons on its way from Brecon to Cardiff, and in 2005 the first walk to span the entire length of the Brecon Beacons National Park was opened. The  route, called the Beacons Way, runs from Abergavenny via The Skirrid in the east and ends in the village of Llangadog in Carmarthenshire in the west.

Brecon Mountain Railway
A railway with narrow gauge trains run by the Brecon Mountain Railway.

See also
 Fforest Fawr Geopark
 Geology of Brecon Beacons National Park

References

External links

 Visitor website of the Brecon Beacons National Park Authority
 Brecon Beacons Park Society a.k.a. Friends of the Brecon Beacons

 
Geography of Monmouthshire
National parks in Wales
Geography of Merthyr Tydfil County Borough
Protected areas established in 1957
Dark sky preserves in Wales
International Dark Sky Reserves